Murara is a village in Jaunpur, Uttar Pradesh, India.

References 

Villages in Jaunpur district